The Air-Sport Ajos is a Polish single-place, paraglider that was designed and produced by Air-Sport of Zakopane. It is now out of production.

Design and development
The Ajos is named after a local wind found in Poland. It was designed as an intermediate glider and was noted in 2003 as being very competitively priced.

The three models are each named for their wing area in square metres.

Variants
Ajos 26
Small-sized model for lighter pilots.
Ajos 28
Mid-sized model for medium-weight pilots.
Ajos 30
Large-sized model for heavier pilots.

Specifications (Ajos 28)

References

Ajos
Paragliders